Elizabeth was a 38-gun fourth rate vessel of the Kingdom of England, Her initial commission was in the Parliamentary Naval Force during the English Civil War. During the Anglo-Dutch War she missed all the major Fleet actions. During the Second Anglo-Dutch War she participated in the St James Day Fight. She was burnt by the Dutch off Virginia in March 1667.

Elizabeth was the second named vessel since it was used for a 16-gun vessel, in service 1577 to 1588.

Construction and specifications
She was built at Deptford Dockyard on the River Thames under the guidance of Master Shipwright Peter Pett I. She was launched in 1647. Her builder's measure tonnage was calculated as  tons.

Her gun armament in 1647 was 38 (wartime)/32 (peacetime) guns. In 1666, her armament was 40 (wartime)/32 (peacetime) and consisted of twelve culverins, twenty demi-culverines, eight sakers. Her manning was 150 personnel in 1652 and rose to 160 a year later. By 1660 her manning had dropped to 130 personnel.

Commissioned service

Service in the English Civil War and Commonwealth Navy
She was commissioned into the Parliamentary Naval Force in 1648 under the command of Captain Jonas Reeves. She was at the recapture of the 14-gun Crescent in November 1648. The following year she participated in the blockade of Kinsale, Ireland in 1649. She sailed with Robert Blake's Fleet off Cadiz in 1650. She followed this with operations in the English Channel in 1651. After being incorporated into the Commonwealth Navy, she sailed with Badiley's Squadron to the Mediterranean in 1652. On 28 August 1652, she was at the Battle of Montecristo, a Dutch victory with the squadron seeking shelter at Elba. She was at the action off Leghorn on 4 March 1653. Later in 1653, she was under command of Captain Christopher Myngs at Home. She was in the Sound during the winter of 1653/54. In 1656, she was under command of Captain Robert Coleman. In 1659, she was under Captain John Grimsditch for operations in the Sound.

Service after the Restoration May 1660
In June 1660, still under Captain Grimsditch, she carried out operations in the Straits. On 1 May 1664, she was under Captain Edward Nixon until his death on 17 May 1665. On 18 May 1665, she was under command of Captain Robert Robinson at Tangier. She captured a Dutch merchantman in the English Channel. On 9 April 1666, she was under Captain Charles Talbot for a convoy to Lisbon. She returned in May 1666. She was a member of Blue Squadron, Van Division at the St James Day Fight on 25 July 1666. On 19 August 1666, she came under command of Captain John Lightfoot for convoy duty off Virginia.

Loss
Elizabeth was burnt in action with the Dutch off Jamestown, Virginia on 5 June 1667. Captain Lightfoot was killed during the action.

Notes

Citations

References

 British Warships in the Age of Sail (1603 – 1714), by Rif Winfield, published by Seaforth Publishing, England © Rif Winfield 2009, EPUB , Chapter 4 Fourth Rates - 'Small Ships', Vessels acquired from 25 March 1603, 1647 Programme Group, Elizabeth
 Colledge, Ships of the Royal Navy, by J.J. Colledge, revised and updated by Lt-Cdr Ben Warlow and Steve Bush, published by Seaforth Publishing, Barnsley, Great Britain, © the estate of J.J. Colledge, Ben Warlow and Steve Bush 2020, EPUB , Section E (Elizabeth)
 The Arming and Fitting of English Ships of War 1600 - 1815, by Brian Lavery, published by US Naval Institute Press © Brian Lavery 1989, Part V Guns, Type of Guns

Ships of the line of the Royal Navy
Ships built in Deptford
1640s ships
Ships of the English navy